The 2009–10 Persian Gulf Cup (also known as Iran Pro League) was the 27th season of Iran's Football League and ninth as Iran Pro League since its establishment in 2001. Esteghlal were the defending champions. The season featured 15 teams from the 2008–09 Persian Gulf Cup and three new teams promoted from the 2008–09 Azadegan League: Steel Azin and Tractor Sazi both as champions and Shahin Bushehr. The league started on 6 August 2009 and ended on 19 May 2010. Sepahan won the Pro League title for the second time in their history (total second Iranian title).

Team information

Stadia and locations

Personnel and sponsoring

Managerial changes

League table

Positions by round

Results

Clubs season-progress

Statistics

Top goalscorers 

Last updated: May 26, 2010Source: iplstats.com/scorers

Top Assistants 

Last updated: May 26, 2010Source: iplstats.com/assistants

Cards 

Last updated: May 26, 2010Source: iplstats.com/cards

Matches played 

Last updated: May 26, 2010Source:  iplstats.com/ appearances

Attendances

Average home attendances

Highest attendances

Notes:Updated to games played on 19 May 2010. Source: iplstats.com

See also 
 2009–10 Azadegan League
 2009–10 Iran Football's 2nd Division
 2009–10 Iran Football's 3rd Division
 2009–10 Hazfi Cup
 Iranian Super Cup
 2009–10 Iranian Futsal Super League

References 

Iran Premier League Statistics
Persian League
Soccerway

Iran Pro League seasons
Iran
1